The String Quartet No. 11 (D 353) in E major was composed by Franz Schubert in 1816. It was posthumously published as Op. 125 No. 2.

Movements
 Allegro con fuoco (E major)
 Andante (A major)
 Menuetto: Allegro vivace (E major, with Trio in C major)
 Rondo: Allegro vivace (E major)

Sources
 Franz Schubert's Works, Series V: Streichquartette edited by Joseph Hellmesberger and Eusebius Mandyczewski. Breitkopf & Härtel, 1890.
 Otto Erich Deutsch (and others). Schubert Thematic Catalogue (several editions), No. 353.
 New Schubert Edition, Series VI, Volume 4: String Quartets II edited by Werner Aderhold, Bärenreiter, 1994.

External links 
 

String quartets by Franz Schubert
1816 compositions